The following is a list of Grammy Awards winners and nominees from the United States.

Winners

Nominations without ever winning

References

American
Grammy